Namma Shivamogga, also known as Team Shivamogga, is a professional T20 cricket club based in Shivamogga, Karnataka, India. It represents Shivamogga in the Karnataka Premier League. The team made its debut in the year 2015.

Squad
This lists all the players who are playing for Namma Shivamogga in the KPL season 5.

See also

 Karnataka Premier League

References

External links
 KPL official website

Karnataka Premier League
Sport in Karnataka
Cricket teams in India
Cricket in Karnataka